Habib Cheikhrouhou (born 9 July 1914, Sfax, Tunisia – died 27 January 1994) was a Tunisian journalist who in 1951 founded Dar Assabah, the parent company that publishes the Assabah and Le Temps daily newspapers in Tunis, Tunisia.

References

Mass media in Tunisia
1914 births
1994 deaths
Tunisian journalists
20th-century journalists